Jeremy Noseda (born 17 September 1963) is a retired British racehorse trainer.

After six years working for John Dunlop, and five years as assistant to John Gosden, he joined Sheikh Mohammed's Godolphin operation in late 1993, and played a significant role in training such horses as Lammtarra, Halling and Balanchine.

Noseda started training under his own name in January 1996, initially in California, then returning to Britain in late 1997. He is based at the Shalfleet stables in Newmarket formerly occupied by Paul Kelleway. He enjoyed his first Classic victory when Araafa won the Irish 2,000 Guineas in 2006. His first triumph in an English Classic came the same year with Sixties Icon winning the St Leger at York. He retired from training in June 2019, saddling his final runner in the Wokingham Stakes at Ascot.

Noseda was educated the Jesuit Catholic school, Stonyhurst College.

Major wins
 Great Britain
 Cheveley Park Stakes - (2) - Wannabe Grand (1998), Carry On Katie (2003)
 Falmouth Stakes - (1) - Simply Perfect (2007)
 Fillies' Mile - (1) - Simply Perfect (2006)
 Golden Jubilee Stakes - (1) - Soldier's Tale (2007)
 July Cup - (1) - Fleeting Spirit (2009)
 Middle Park Stakes - (1) - Balmont (2003)
 St. James's Palace Stakes - (1) - Araafa (2006)
 St. Leger - (1) - Sixties Icon (2006)
 Sussex Stakes - (1) - Proclamation (2005)

 Ireland
 Irish 2,000 Guineas - (1) - Araafa (2006)
 Irish St Leger - (1) - Sans Frontieres (2010)

 United States
 Breeders' Cup Juvenile - (1) - Wilko (2004)
 Jamaica Handicap - (1) - Western Aristocrat (2011)

References

External links
 jeremynoseda.com
 NTRA.com

Living people
1963 births
British racehorse trainers
People educated at Stonyhurst College